Skatval Church is a parish church of the Church of Norway in Stjørdal municipality in Trøndelag county, Norway. It is located in the village of Skatval. It is the church for the Skatval parish which is part of the Stjørdal prosti (deanery) in the Diocese of Nidaros. The white, wooden church was built in a long church design and a Swiss chalet style in 1901 using plans drawn up by the architect Johan Wæhre. The church seats about 440 people.

History
The historic Auran Church and Fløan Church both served the Skatval area for centuries before they were both closed in 1589 and the Skatval Church must have taken over for both of them. When the Skatval Church was established is unknown. The earliest existing historical records of this church date back to the year 1520, but the church was not new that year. The first church on this site may have been a stave church, but not much is known about it. From 1670-1692, the church was extensively rebuilt and enlarged. In 1854, the church was enlarged by adding a north and south transept to create a cruciform floor plan. The new church was consecrate on 6 November 1901.

Media gallery

See also
List of churches in Nidaros

References

Stjørdal
Churches in Trøndelag
Long churches in Norway
Wooden churches in Norway
20th-century Church of Norway church buildings
Churches completed in 1901
15th-century establishments in Norway